José Alfonso Maslucán Culqui is a Peruvian politician. He was a Congressman representing Amazonas for the period 2006–2011, and belongs to the Union for Peru party.

References

External links
 Official site

Living people
Year of birth missing (living people)
21st-century Peruvian politicians
Union for Peru politicians
Members of the Congress of the Republic of Peru